Songs of the Free is the third studio album by Gang of Four, released in 1982. It is their first with Sara Lee as bassist, replacing Dave Allen. In 1996, Infinite Zero Archive/American Recordings label issued it on CD, with two bonus tracks, and with a slightly changed song order (swapping the positions of "Muscle for Brains" and "We Live as We Dream, Alone"), and mistitling "I Love a Man in a Uniform" as "I Love a Man in Uniform." EMI reissued the album on CD in 2008 with the original song order and no bonus tracks.

Pitchfork listed Songs of the Free as 99th best album of the 1980s.

Rhino Records re-released Songs of the Free in                             limited edition of 6,250 on 180-gram blue, purple, and yellow splattered vinyl for Black Friday Record Store Day 2015.

Track listing
All songs written by Andy Gill and Jon King
All songs written at Mount Pleasant Studios, 38 Mount Pleasant, London E1; with special assistance from Jon Astrop
Side one
"Call Me Up" – 3:35
"I Love a Man in a Uniform" – 4:06
"Muscle for Brains" – 3:17
"It Is Not Enough" – 3:27
"Life! It's a Shame" – 5:06
Side two
"I Will Be a Good Boy" – 3:52
"The History of the World" – 4:40
"We Live as We Dream, Alone" – 3:37
"Of the Instant" – 4:58

1996 bonus tracks
"The World at Fault" – 3:38
"I Love a Man in a Uniform" (dub) – 4:48

Personnel
Gang of Four
Hugo Burnham – drums, percussion
Andrew Gill – guitar, vocals
Jon King – vocals, melodica
Sara Lee – bass, backing vocals
with:
Stevie Lange – backing vocals
Joy Yates – backing vocals
Technical
Simon Smart, Walter Samuel - engineer
Shot That Tiger! - art direction, design
Colin Barker - photography

Charts
Album

Single

References

1982 albums
Gang of Four (band) albums
Albums produced by Mike Howlett
EMI Records albums
Albums produced by Andy Gill